Erythronium californicum, the California fawn lily, is a species of flowering plant in the family Liliaceae, endemic to moist woodland habitats in the mountains of Northern California.

Description
It is an herbaceous hardy perennial growing from a pointed bulb 3 to 6 cm wide and producing two basal leaves which are sometimes spotted with brown. The flower has yellowish-white tepals 2 to 4 cm long, sometimes with red or brown banding or striping toward the bases. The stamens, anthers, and stigma are whitish in color.

The cultivars 'Brocklamont Inheritance'  and  'White Beauty' have gained the Royal Horticultural Society's Award of Garden Merit.

References

External links

Jepson Manual Treatment — Erythronium californicum
Erythronium californicum — Photo gallery

californicum
Endemic flora of California
Flora of the Klamath Mountains
Flora of the Sierra Nevada (United States)
Natural history of the California Coast Ranges
Plants described in 1904